In the Mind of Jamie Cullum is a compilation CD made by Jamie Cullum featuring the following tracks:

 Nina Simone – I Think It's Gonna Rain Today
 Luiz Bonfá – Perdido de Amor
 Mark Murphy – Stolen Moments
 Jamie Cullum – I'd Probably Do It Again (previously unreleased)
 Laurent Garnier – Acid Eiffel
 Quasimoto – Jazz Cats Pt. 1
 Charles Mingus – Fables of Faubus
 Jamie Cullum – After You've Gone (previously unreleased)
 Donovan – Get Thy Bearings
 Elbow – Station Approach
 Cinematic Orchestra – All Things to All Men
 Herbie Hancock – Nobu
 Roni Size – Brown Paper Bag
 Clipse & Pharrell – Mr Me Too
 The Bad Plus – Flim
 Polyphony & Stephen Layton – Sleep

Jamie Cullum and Ben Cullum launched the album at the Forum in London on 7 September, and played a gig in support of it on the same day.

References

Jamie Cullum albums
District6 albums
2007 compilation albums